Sokaneh or Sokkaneh may refer to:
 Sokaneh, Isfahan
 Sokaneh, Lorestan
 Sokaneh, Markazi